The 2013 Kremlin  Cup was a tennis tournament played on indoor hard courts. It was the 24th edition of the Kremlin Cup for the men (18th edition for the women) and part of the ATP World Tour 250 Series of the 2013 ATP World Tour, and of the Premier Series of the 2013 WTA Tour. It was held at the Olympic Stadium in Moscow, Russia, from 12 October through 20 October 2013. Richard Gasquet and Simona Halep won the singles titles.

Points and prize money

Point distribution

Prize money

* per team

ATP singles main-draw entrants

Seeds

 Rankings are as of October 7, 2013

Other entrants
The following players received wildcards into the singles main draw:
  Teymuraz Gabashvili 
  Karen Khachanov 
  Andrey Kuznetsov

The following players received entry from the qualifying draw:
  Andrey Golubev 
  Aslan Karatsev 
  Mikhail Kukushkin
  Oleksandr Nedovyesov

Withdrawals
Before the tournament
  Nikolay Davydenko (wrist injury)
  Martin Kližan 
  Lu Yen-hsun
  Stanislas Wawrinka

Retirements
  Édouard Roger-Vasselin
  Filippo Volandri (right thigh strain)

ATP doubles main-draw entrants

Seeds

1 Rankings are as of October 7, 2013

Other entrants
The following pairs received wildcards into the doubles main draw:
  Victor Baluda /  Konstantin Kravchuk 
  Aslan Karatsev /  Andrey Kuznetsov
The following pair received entry as alternates:
  Andrey Golubev /  Horacio Zeballos

Withdrawals
Before the tournament
  Albert Ramos (food poisoning)

WTA singles main-draw entrants

Seeds

 Rankings are as of October 7, 2013

Other entrants
The following players received wildcards into the singles main draw:
  Alisa Kleybanova
  Ksenia Pervak

The following players received entry from the qualifying draw:
  Sofia Arvidsson
  Vesna Dolonc 
  Danka Kovinić
  Arantxa Parra Santonja

The following player received entry as a lucky loser:
  Vera Dushevina

Withdrawals
Before the tournament
  Sara Errani (low back injury)
  Jelena Janković (back injury)
  Angelique Kerber (abdominal strain)
  Petra Kvitová (back injury)
  Ekaterina Makarova (right wrist injury)
  Urszula Radwańska

Retirements
  Magdaléna Rybáriková (upper respiratory infection)

WTA doubles main-draw entrants

Seeds

1 Rankings are as of October 7, 2013

Other entrants
The following pair received wildcard into the doubles main draw:
  Anastasia Bukhanko /  Margarita Gasparyan

Retirements
  Daniela Hantuchová (right foot injury)

Finals

Men's singles

 Richard Gasquet defeated  Mikhail Kukushkin, 4–6, 6–4, 6–4

Women's singles

 Simona Halep defeated  Samantha Stosur, 7–6(7–1), 6–2

Men's doubles

 Mikhail Elgin /  Denis Istomin defeated  Ken Skupski /  Neal Skupski, 6–2, 1–6, [14–12]

Women's doubles

 Svetlana Kuznetsova /  Samantha Stosur defeated  Alla Kudryavtseva /  Anastasia Rodionova, 6–1, 1–6, [10–8]

References

External links
 

Kremlin Cup
Kremlin Cup
Kremlin Cup
2013 in Russian tennis
2013 in Moscow
October 2013 sports events in Russia